Raúl Eduardo Peñaranda Contreras (born 2 May 1991) is a Colombian professional footballer who plays as a striker for Salvadoran club FAS. Besides Colombia, he has played in El Salvador.

Early life
Peñaranda was born in the city of Santa Marta in Colombia's Magdalena Department.

Club career

Alianza
In July 2019, Peñaranda signed with Salvadoran Primera División side Alianza. He made his debut on 28 July 2020 in a 2–2 draw against FAS, receiving a red card in the 90th minute. That year, Peñaranda finished fifth in scoring over the course of the Apertura season, scoring eleven goals in seventeen appearances, and added another two goals in three playoff appearances as Alianza won the opening season. Peñaranda also stood out in CONCACAF League play, appearing in all eight of Alianza's matches and scoring four goals in a run to the semi-finals, where they were eliminated by Honduran side Motagua.

FAS
On 8 January 2020, Peñaranda signed with FAS. He made his debut on 19 January in a 1–0 win over Municipal Limeño.

Career statistics

Honours

Club
FAS
Salvadoran Primera División: Clausura 2021

References

External links

1991 births
Living people
Association football forwards
Colombian footballers
People from Santa Marta
Colombian expatriate footballers
Expatriate footballers in Venezuela
Colombian expatriate sportspeople in Venezuela
Expatriate footballers in Panama
Colombian expatriate sportspeople in Panama
Expatriate footballers in El Salvador
Colombian expatriate sportspeople in El Salvador
Barranquilla F.C. footballers
Once Caldas footballers
Jaguares de Córdoba footballers
Unión Magdalena footballers
Deportivo Anzoátegui players
C.D. Árabe Unido players
Alianza F.C. footballers
C.D. FAS footballers
Categoría Primera B players
Categoría Primera A players
Venezuelan Segunda División players
Venezuelan Primera División players
Liga Panameña de Fútbol players
Salvadoran Primera División players
Sportspeople from Magdalena Department